Truth about Kerry is a 2011 suspense film. It was written by Shaun O'Sullivan and Katherine Torpey, directed by Katherine Torpey, produced by Shaun O'Sullivan, Katie Torpey & Tony Zanelotti, and stars Stana Katic, Jessica Dean and Darren Keefe. The film was shot in County Kerry, Ireland, and in San Francisco, California, USA. The film is currently going on post production, and is scheduled to be released in the Film Festival

Plot 
Kerry Carlson goes to Ireland with her boyfriend, Hunter, to visit his childhood friend, Patrick. Two weeks later, Kerry is found dead on a beach. Her mysterious death has destroyed the world of her best friend Emma, who was supposed to go on the trip with her but canceled at the last minute. A few weeks after her death, Emma starts having nightmares about Kerry.

Emma travels to a remote village in Ireland to investigate the mysterious circumstances surrounding her best friend Kerry’s death. Distraught by constant dreams and haunting visions of Kerry, Emma refuses to believe that the death was an accident. After arriving in the small, fishing village where Kerry died, Emma realizes the death was never really investigated and the locals don't want to talk to her. Her quest, to find out what really happened, targets one local villager named Patrick, who she believes may have been fatally obsessed with Kerry.

Desperate to prove that Patrick was involved, it isn’t long before Emma believes that the village may be hiding more secrets than she thought, and that foul play may have led to Kerry’s death… or murder.

Emma breaks into Patrick's house and finds pictures of Kerry. Eventually, she learns that Kerry had asked him to take those pictures after getting into a fight with Patrick at the local bar. Her fiance arrives in town and Emma accuses him of being the cause of Kerry's death because of the timing of his proposal causing her to bail on the trip.

Emma comes to believe that Kerry killed herself and leaves with her fiance after making amends with Patrick and asking him for one of Kerry's pictures. However, after she leaves it is revealed in a flashback that the friendly barkeep had taken Kerry to a secluded beach and brutally beat and raped her. Only pausing during the assault to pick up a phone call and answering it as if nothing was wrong. He then dragged her to the water and drowned her.

Cast 
 Stana Katic as Emma
 Jessica Dean as Kerry
 Darren Keefe as Patrick
 Paul Hardiman as Joseph
 Ryan King as Daniel
 Rick Yudt as Hunter

References

External links
 
 

2011 films
2011 drama films
American drama films
Films shot in San Francisco
Films shot in the Republic of Ireland
2010s English-language films
2010s American films